On October 11, 1836, a special election was held in , to fill a vacancy left by the resignation of John Banks (AM) on April 2.  This election was held at the same time as the general elections for the 25th Congress

Election results

Pearson took his seat December 5, 1836, at the start of the second session of the 24th Congress.

See also
List of special elections to the United States House of Representatives

References

Pennsylvania 1836 24
Pennsylvania 1836 24
1836 24
Pennsylvania 24
United States House of Representatives 24
United States House of Representatives 1836 24